Gerrit Jacobus Visagie (born 8 July 1992 in Cape Town) is a South African rugby union player for the  in the United Rugby Championship and the  in the Currie Cup and also played for Stade Toulousain in the French Top 14. His regular position is hooker.

Career

Youth

Visagie represented the Boland Under-16 side at the 2008 Grant Khomo Week and the Under-18 side at the 2010 Craven Week competition. In 2010, he played for the  side in the 2010 Under-19 Provincial Championship competition, making two appearances.

He also played for the  side in the 2012 and 2013 Under-21 competitions, winning the competition in the former season and ending as runners-up in the latter.

He was initially named in a Varsity Cup Dream Team at the conclusion of the 2015 Varsity Cup tournament, but withdrew and was replaced by Elandré Huggett.

Blue Bulls

He made a further two appearances in that competition.

He was also included in the  training squad prior to the 2014 Super Rugby season, but wasn't included in the final squad.

Gloucester Rugby

In November 2018, he joined Gloucester on loan until January 2019. He made seven appearances during this spell, scoring three tries.

References

South African rugby union players
Living people
1992 births
Rugby union players from Cape Town
Blue Bulls players
Bulls (rugby union) players
Gloucester Rugby players
Stade Toulousain players
Lions (United Rugby Championship) players
Golden Lions players
Rugby union hookers